Kirchhoff's laws, named after Gustav Kirchhoff, may refer to:

 Kirchhoff's circuit laws in electrical engineering
 Kirchhoff's law of thermal radiation
 Kirchhoff equations in fluid dynamics
 Kirchhoff's three laws of spectroscopy
 Kirchhoff's law of thermochemistry

See also
 Kerckhoffs's principle, of Auguste Kerckhoffs 
 List of scientific laws named after people
 Ohm's law